The 17th Artistic Gymnastics World Championships were held in Hala Tivoli, Ljubljana, SR Slovenia, SFR Yugoslavia, in 1970.

Cathy Rigby won the first medal for the United States women at the World Championships with a silver on balance beam.

Results

Medals

Men

Team Final

All-around

Floor Exercise

Pommel Horse

Rings

Vault

Parallel Bars

Horizontal Bar

Women

Team Final

All-around

Vault

Uneven Bars

Balance Beam

Floor Exercise

References

External links
Gymn Forum: World Championships Results
Gymnastics

World Artistic Gymnastics Championships
World Artistic Gymnastics Championships
World Artistic Gymnastics Championships
Sport in Ljubljana
International gymnastics competitions hosted by Yugoslavia